Chris Johns is a Welsh former professional darts player. He played county darts for Glamorgan and participated in the BDO World Darts Championship on five occasions. He is best remembered as a controversial figure in an acrimonious split in the game between 1992 and 1994.

Career

Johns made his debut at the 1988 Embassy World Championship, reaching the second round. He made four further appearances at the championships, losing in the first round in 1989, 1991, and 1993, and in the second round in 1992. His only two wins at Lakeside were against Mike Gregory in 1988 and Steve Beaton in 1992.

He had only moderate success in British Darts Organisation (BDO) Open tournaments. As early as 1986, he reached the semi-finals of the Winmau World Masters – beating Eric Bristow in the last 16, before falling to Bob Anderson in the last four. He later reached the semi-finals of the Swiss Open in 1991, and of the Denmark Open in the same year.

He was one of the 16 players who decided to leave the BDO and form a new organisation – the World Darts Council (WDC), which later became the Professional Darts Corporation (PDC). Following the 1993 Embassy World Championship, the BDO suspended the "rebel" players from all tournaments. This also meant that their exhibition work would be restricted – which may have contributed to Johns having a change of heart, and deciding to return to the BDO. Mike Gregory followed suit shortly afterwards; both players were ostracised by the remaining 14 WDC players, who felt they had been let down.

Following the split, Johns never made another appearance at the BDO World Championship, and never featured in the later rounds of any BDO Open events again.

World Championship results

BDO

 1988: Second round (lost to Rick Ney 2–3) (sets)
 1989: First round (lost to Paul Lim 0–3)
 1991: First round (lost to Tony Payne 1–3)
 1992: Second round (lost to Mike Gregory 0–3)
 1993: First round (lost to John Lowe 1–3)

External links
Profile and stats on Darts Database

Living people
Welsh darts players
British Darts Organisation players
Professional Darts Corporation founding players
Year of birth missing (living people)